Andrzej Pronaszko (31 December 1888 in Derebchyn - 15 January 1961 in Warsaw) was a Polish painter and scenographer, one of the most prominent representatives of the Young Poland movement and the Polish avant-garde of the 1920s and 1930s, Zbigniew Pronaszko's brother.

In occupied Poland, Pronaszko was a member of the Polish resistance, and a director of the Department of Microphotography at the Bureau of Information and Propaganda of Armia Krajowa. He was also involved with the underground theatre.

After the war Pronaszko became the lecturer at the Academy of Theatre in Warsaw (Akademia Teatralna im. Aleksandra Zelwerowicza).

Notes and references
 Irena Kossowska, Monika Mokrzycka-Pokora;  "Andrzej Pronaszko", Kultura polska, Instytut Adama Mickiewicza, 2006
  "PRONASZKO, Andrzej (1888-1961)", Encyclopedia INTERIA.PL "Wiedza" 1999-2010

1888 births
1961 deaths
Polish set decorators
20th-century Polish painters
20th-century Polish male artists
Home Army members
People from Vinnytsia Oblast
Polish male painters